Bompensiere (Sicilian: Naduri) is a comune in the province of Caltanissetta in the south of Sicily, Italy.

Physical geography

Territory 
The municipal territory is located almost at the center of Sicily, in a hilly area whose average height above sea level is 290 meters. It extends on a slope of Mount Marrobio stretching from south-east to north-west for about one kilometer.

The town is arranged along a single main street on whose sides the houses are divided, almost uniformly distributed. The lowest point of the town is to the north-west, at an altitude of about 270 meters above sea level (Piana Giarre); the highest point is located in the south-east at an altitude of about 320 meters above sea level (Contrada Portella).

References

Municipalities of the Province of Caltanissetta